Jeannie T. Lee is a Professor of Genetics (and Pathology) at Harvard Medical School and the Massachusetts General Hospital, and a Howard Hughes Medical Institute Investigator. She is known for her work on X-chromosome inactivation and for discovering the functions of a new class of epigenetic regulators known as long noncoding RNAs (lncRNAs), including Xist and Tsix.

Education 
Jeannie T. Lee received an AB from Harvard College in Biochemistry & Molecular Biology and an MD/PhD in 1993 from the University of Pennsylvania School of Medicine. While at Harvard she worked with Nancy Kleckner on antisense regulation of Tn10 transposition.  While at University of Pennsylvania School of Medicine her advisor was Robert L. Nussbaum. Her PhD research focused on Fragile X syndrome, and led to her strong interest in X chromosome inactivation and epigenetics. Then she did postdoctoral work with Rudolf Jaenisch at the Whitehead Institute , during which she discovered the nature of the X-inactivation center. She was also Chief Resident of Laboratory Medicine at the Massachusetts General Hospital.

Research career 
Lee joined the faculty at Harvard in 1997 and devoted her studies to noncoding RNA and sex chromosome dynamics during development and disease. Her major career research achievements include identifying the X inactivation center, discovering Tsix antisense RNA, determining Xist's mechanism of action,  demonstrating that a lncRNA is a regulator of Polycomb repressive complex 2, and determining that the X chromosome folds like origami and adopts a unique conformation.

Her studies established the existence and function of a group of lncRNAs. In a 2013 interview, she stated that this group of RNAs excited her because they control gene expression in a locus-specific way, by recruiting chromatin modifying activities to the locus, making the lncRNAs excellent drug design targets. She founded RaNA Therapeutics to test this idea.

Upon conferring the Lurie Prize to Lee in 2016, Dr. Charles A. Sanders of the Foundation for the National Institutes of Health remarked: “Dr. Lee’s work has revolutionized the field of epigenetics. Her research has led to groundbreaking contributions, and we now have a better understanding of the unique role that long non-coding RNAs play in gene expression, which could lead to the development of new therapeutics.”

Lee was President of the Genetics Society of America, Codirector of the Harvard Epigenetics Initiative, and is Vice Chair of the Department of Molecular Biology, Massachusetts General Hospital, Harvard Medical School.  She delivered a set of lectures to iBiology on X chromosome inactivation.

Notable publications 

 Polycomb proteins targeted by a short repeat RNA to the mouse X chromosome. J Zhao, BK Sun, JA Erwin, JJ Song, JT Lee. Science, 2008 
 Long noncoding RNAs: past, present, and future. JTY Kung, D Colognori, JT Lee. Genetics, 2013 
 Epigenetic regulation by long noncoding RNAs. JT Lee. Science, 2012 
 Genome-wide identification of polycomb-associated RNAs by RIP-seq.  J Zhao, T Ohsumi, ... JT Lee. Molecular Cell, 2010 
 YY1 tethers Xist RNA to the inactive X nucleation center.  Y Jeon, JT Lee. Cell, 2011 
 Transient homologous chromosome pairing marks the onset of X inactivation. N Xu, CL Tsai, JT Lee. Science, 2006 
 Tsix, a gene antisense to Xist at the X-inactivation centre. JT Lee, LS Davidow, D Warshawsky. Nature Genetics, 1999 
 A 450 kb transgene displays properties of the mammalian X-inactivation center.  JT Lee, WM Strauss, JA Dausman, R Jaenisch. Cell, 1996

Awards 
 1998 Basil O'Connor Scholar Award
 2000 Pew Scholar 
 2010 Elected Fellow of the American Association for the Advancement of Science (AAAS)
 2010 Molecular Biology Award from the National Academy of Sciences
 2011 NIH MERIT Award 
 2014 Distinguished Graduate Award of the University of Pennsylvania Perelman School of Medicine
 2015 Elected member of the National Academy of Sciences
 2016 Centennial Award from GENETICS, Genetics Society of America
 2016 Lurie Prize in Biomedical Sciences from the Foundation for the National Institutes of Health
2018 Harrington Rare Genetic Disease Scholar

References 

Year of birth missing (living people)
Living people
Harvard Medical School faculty
Perelman School of Medicine at the University of Pennsylvania alumni
American geneticists
Fellows of the American Association for the Advancement of Science
Harvard University alumni
American women biologists
Members of the United States National Academy of Sciences
Cell biologists
American women academics
21st-century American women